The Gulfstream IV (or G-IV or GIV) and derivatives are a family of twinjet aircraft, mainly for private or business use. They were designed and built by Gulfstream Aerospace, a General Dynamics company based in Savannah, Georgia, United States, from 1985 until 2018. Aircraft power is provided by two Rolls-Royce RB.183 Tay turbofans.

Upon delivery of the last G450, over 900 GIV/GIV-SP/G450 units had been produced. The last G450 was delivered on 19 January 2018 after 365 deliveries over 12 years, ending a 30-year production run, to be replaced by the G500.

Development

Gulfstream, in collaboration with Grumman, began work on the Gulfstream IV in March 1983 as a re-engined, stretched fuselage derivative of the Gulfstream III. 
The first GIV made its maiden flight on September 19, 1985. The model received type certification from the FAA on April 22, 1987. The G-IV entered into service with serial number 1000 in 1987 and was upgraded to the special purpose GIV-SP version at serial number 1214 in 1993.  It was later redesignated G400 at serial number 1500.
A shorter range variant was created based on the GIV and given the G300 designation in 2002.

In 2001, Gulfstream began work on an improved version of the GIV-SP, originally designated GIV-X.  It was later renamed G450.  The G450 is lengthened 1 ft (0.305 m) over the G400 and shares the forward fuselage and larger cockpit of the G550.  Production of the G450 began in October 2004, replacing the G400.  The G450 has better performance and comes with the PlaneView cockpit with four 14-inch (355 mm) liquid crystal displays and a Head up display (HUD).  The shorter range G350 version of the G450 was developed and received certification in 2004.

By 2018, 1990 to 1992 GIVs were for sale at $1.6-4.4 million, 1992 to 1999 GIVSPs were listed for $1.25-5.2 million, 15-year-old G300s and G400s were available for $4.5-7 million and 2006 to 2016 G450s at $9.95-23.75 million.

Design

Compared to the Gulfstream III, a decision to redesign the wing structure for weight reduction presented an opportunity for an aerodynamic redesign of the wing to reduce cruise drag and increase range. Wing contour modifications had to be restricted to the forward 65% of wing chord so that no redesign of the control surfaces would be necessary. Modification of the inboard wing would have entailed a redesign of the fuselage floor structure, consequently this region of the wing was not modified. Outboard wing modifications were aimed at reducing the peak subcritical pressure coefficient and moving it aft in an effort to reduce shock strength and increase shock sweep.

At 12,420 lbs, the Rolls-Royce Tay fanjet engines provided more thrust than the 11,400 lbs of the Gulfstream III. Speed, noise levels, emissions, fuel economy, range, and cargo capacity were also markedly improved over the earlier model.

The Gulfstream IV wing has a weaker, more swept outboard shock resulting in a lower cruise drag. Other benefits arising from this design are a lower root bending moment due to the more inboard center of pressure, a lower stall speed due to washout and a larger fuel volume due to increased chord. These aerodynamic improvements result in an increase in range of over 300 nautical miles.
In addition to the wing redesign, the Gulfstream IV also became the first business jet to have an entire glass cockpit.

The G400 has a large cabin, long range of 4,350 nautical miles (8,060 km) and the same comfort and design that characterize the G series. Maximum cruise height and speed are 45,000 ft and Mach 0.85. Earlier models were fitted with Honeywell's SPZ 8000 Avionics package. The SPZ 8400 Avionics Package was an option, becoming standard on later models. Its second-hand price was below $15 million in 2009. Gulfstream had also considered making a  longer, 24-27 seat model for airline use.

Operational history

The National Oceanic and Atmospheric Administration (NOAA) operates a GIV-SP (N49RF) modified to fly scientists and crew members at 45,000 feet around tropical cyclones. The aircraft was modified to drop instruments called "dropsondes" to measure windspeed, barometric pressure, humidity, and temperature as they fall to the surface of the ocean. By sampling the cyclone with these dropsondes over a 4,000 mile track around the storm, the forecasters at NOAA's National Hurricane Center and Hurricane Research Division can better predict where the hurricane will be "steered" by the upper level winds. They also predict wind shear that will either increase or decrease a hurricane's strength. The GIV-SP is suited for this mission since it is fast, and can fly long distances with ample cabin space for the crew and instruments.  In 2009, the NOAA GIV-SP was further modified by the addition of a side-scanning Doppler radar to the rear fuselage. This radar is used for storm cloud profiling.

In June 1987 a Gulfstream IV set 22 world records in its class in flying west around the world in 45 hr 25 min.  The next year another GIV set 11 world records flying east around the world.  In 1990, Gulfstream CEO Allen Paulson and a Gulfstream flight crew set 35 international records for around-the-world flight in a GIV.

Variants

C-20F/G/H/J military variants

The U.S. military variant of the IV, designated C-20F/G/H/J Gulfstream IV in Department of Defense service.  The C-20F is a GIV model operated by the U.S. Army in a command/executive transport role.

The C-20G aircraft may be configured for cargo operations, 26 passenger operations or combinations of the two. With passengers seats removed, it may be configured as three pallets with no passengers or two pallets and eight passengers or one pallet and fourteen passengers. With full seating, the aircraft is capable of accommodating up to twenty-six passengers and a crew of four. A hydraulically operated cargo door is installed on the starboard side of the aircraft, and a ball roller cargo floor is capable of accommodating palletized cargo.  The C-20G was operated by Fleet Logistics Support Squadron Four Eight (VR-48) at Naval Air Facility, Andrews Air Force Base, Maryland before its 2012 deactivation. It is operated by VMR Detachment Kaneohe Bay, Marine Corps Air Station Kaneohe Bay, Marine Corps Base Hawaii. The C-20G is also known as the "Grey Ghost"

The C-20H is a GIV-SP model operated by the U.S. Air Force in a command/executive transport role.  The C-20J is a GIV-SP model operated by the U.S. Army in a command/executive transport role.

The United States Department of Defense C-20A/B/C/D/E aircraft are all Gulfstream III variants.

G350/G450

The G450 is a designation for the model GIV-X, approved by the FAA on August 12, 2004, as is the G350, which has a reduced fuel capacity. Compared to the Gulfstream IV, its fuselage is 12 inches longer and the main entry door relocated aft. The Rolls-Royce Tay 611 engines are replaced by 611-8Cs with FADEC, redesigned thrust reversers, nacelles and pylons which increases range and payload, coupled with  aerodynamic improvements. Many Gulfstream V-SP improvements are used: the Honeywell advanced flight deck display suite, electrical power generation, cabin temperature control and pressurization, nose and nose landing gear. It also has an improved APU and flap/stab actuation system, redesigned main landing gear wheels and brakes, flight control system hard-over protection system.

By the end of the G450 production run, 365 aircraft were produced, with prices ranging from $15 million to $32 million.

Operators

Civil operators

The aircraft is operated by private individuals, companies and executive charter operators, and in fractional ownership programs.

Government and military operators

 Sultan of Brunei

 Chilean Air Force 

 Côte d'Ivoire Air Force

 Japan Air Self-Defense Force 

 Sultan of Johor

 Royal Netherlands Air Force

 Royal Saudi Air Force  

 Swedish Air Force 

 Tanzania Air Force Command

 United States Air Force  
 United States Army   
 United States Navy   
 United States Marine Corps

Former military operators 

 The Irish Air Corps previously operated a G-IV as a government transport.

 The Government of Uganda purchased one G-IV SP in December 2000 at a cost of US$31.5 million for Presidential flights. It was replaced in February 2009 by a G550.

Specifications

See also

References

Citations

Bibliography

External links

 
 
 

Gulfstream aircraft
1980s United States business aircraft
Twinjets
T-tail aircraft
Aircraft first flown in 1985
Low-wing aircraft